Allen Tarwater West (August 2, 1872 – August 31, 1952) was an American tennis player who competed in the 1904 Summer Olympics. In 1904 he won the bronze medal with his partner Joseph Wear in the doubles competition.

References

External links
 
 
 

1872 births
1952 deaths
American male tennis players
Olympic bronze medalists for the United States in tennis
Tennis players at the 1904 Summer Olympics
Medalists at the 1904 Summer Olympics